Dingle is a locality situated in Munkedal Municipality, Västra Götaland County, Sweden with 900 inhabitants in 2010.

References 

Populated places in Västra Götaland County
Populated places in Munkedal Municipality